Marko Tredup (born 15 May 1974 in East Berlin) is a German former professional footballer who played as a right-back.

Tredup made 142 appearances in the 2. Bundesliga during his playing career.

External links 
 

1974 births
Living people
Footballers from Berlin
German footballers
Association football fullbacks
2. Bundesliga players
FC Hansa Rostock players
Tennis Borussia Berlin players
1. FC Union Berlin players
VfL Osnabrück players
Rot Weiss Ahlen players
East German footballers
People from East Berlin